The shiny pigtoe (Fusconaia cor) is a species of bivalve in the family Unionidae. It is endemic to the United States.

This species appears to be most closely related to Fusconaia cuneolus.

References

Molluscs of the United States
Fusconaia
Bivalves described in 1834
Taxa named by Timothy Abbott Conrad
Taxonomy articles created by Polbot
ESA endangered species